Terry Scott (born June 23, 1964) is an American retired sprinter. He was the NCAA champion in the 100 meters in 1985 for the University of Tennessee.

References

1964 births
Living people
American male sprinters
Universiade medalists in athletics (track and field)
Place of birth missing (living people)
Universiade gold medalists for the United States
Medalists at the 1983 Summer Universiade